Verheyen's multimammate mouse (Mastomys kollmannspergeri) is a species of rodent in the family Muridae found in Cameroon, Chad, Niger, Nigeria, and Sudan.
Its natural habitats are dry savanna, intermittent rivers, intermittent freshwater lakes, and urban areas.

References

Mastomys
Rodents of Africa
Mammals described in 1898
Taxonomy articles created by Polbot